Road to Freedom was a monthly anarchist political journal published by Hippolyte Havel. The journal is known as the successor to Emma Goldman's Mother Earth.

History and profile
Road to Freedom existed between 1924 and May 1932. The founder was the Francisco Ferrer Association. The journal was first published in Stelton, New Jersey and then, in New York City. Its contributors included Rose Pesotta, Joseph Spivak, Hippolyte Havel and S Van Valkenburgh. Until February 1929 Hippolyte Havel edited the magazine. A weekly newspaper, Freedom, succeeded Road to Freedom.

See also
List of anarchist periodicals

References 

 Paul Avrich, Anarchist Voices

Anarchist periodicals published in the United States
Defunct political magazines published in the United States
Magazines established in 1924
Magazines disestablished in 1932
Magazines published in New Jersey
Magazines published in New York (state)